Dimitris Kataleifos (born 1954) is a Greek actor and writer. He appeared in more than twenty films since 1978.

Selected filmography

References

External links 

1954 births
Living people
Greek male film actors
Male actors from Athens